Hygromia golasi is a species of small air-breathing land snail, a terrestrial pulmonate gastropod mollusk in the family Hygromiidae, the hairy snails and their allies. This species is endemic to Andorra.

References

golasi
Endemic fauna of Andorra
Endemic molluscs of the Iberian Peninsula
Gastropods described in 1992
Taxonomy articles created by Polbot